Hall Prison is a prison facility 5 kilometres southeast of Södertälje, Sweden. The prison is one of the largest in Sweden and is categorised as an A-prison.

History
The prison opened in 1940, although the old facility dates back to 1875.

 On 28 July 2004, Tony Olsson, Daniel Maiorana, Alfred Sansiviero and Mahmoud Amaya managed to make a getaway from the prison.

References

External links
Anstalten Hall 

Prisons in Sweden
Buildings and structures in Stockholm County